Ivica Hmjelovac (born 2 May 1946) is a Croatian gymnast. He competed in eight events at the 1972 Summer Olympics.

References

1946 births
Living people
Croatian male artistic gymnasts
Olympic gymnasts of Yugoslavia
Gymnasts at the 1972 Summer Olympics
Sportspeople from Slavonski Brod